Hex file or hex file format may refer to:

 Intel hex format, a hex file format by Intel since 1973
 Digital Research hex format, a hex file format by Digital Research
 elektor assembler hex format (EASM), a hex file format by elektor
 Microchip Technology hex format, a hex file format by Microchip
 MOS Technology file format, a hex file format by MOS Technology
 Motorola hex format, a hex file format by Motorola
 Tektronix hex format, hex file format by Tektronix
 Texas Instruments hex format, a hex file format by Texas Instruments
 Universal hex format, a hex file format by the BBC/Micro:bit
 Zilog hex format, a hex file format by Zilog

See also
 Hex dump
 Hexadecimal notation
 Alphanumeric executable
 Executable ASCII code
 IBM hexadecimal floating-point
 P notation